Events in the year 1953 in Spain.

Incumbents
Caudillo: Francisco Franco

Births

February 14 - Valero Rivera López.
March 4 - Agustí Villaronga.
April 12 - Álex Angulo. (d. 2014)
August 27 - Rosa Miguélez.
Antonio Hernández.

Deaths
 May 19 – Dámaso Berenguer, Spanish soldier and Prime Minister (b. 1873)
 September 24 – Jacobo Fitz-James Stuart, 17th Duke of Alba, Spanish aristocrat (b. 1878)

See also
 List of Spanish films of 1953

References

 
Years of the 20th century in Spain
1950s in Spain
Spain
Spain